Yuan-Pern Lee (born 25 January 1952) is a Taiwanese chemist.

Lee was born on 25 January 1952 in Hsinchu, Taiwan, the youngest of painter Lee Tze-fan's three sons. Lee studied chemistry at National Taiwan University and pursued a doctorate in the subject from the University of California, Berkeley. He began a research career in 1979 at the  National Oceanic and Atmospheric Administration before accepting a teaching position at National Tsing Hua University in 1981. Lee was named a fellow of the American Physical Society in 1999, and subsequently considered multiple times for membership in the Academia Sinica. Eventually, Yuan-Pern Lee was inducted into Academia Sinica in 2008, and the Lees became the first family to have three members serve simultaneously as academicians of Academia Sinica. Yuan-Pern Lee's induction followed that of his brothers Yuan-Chuan Lee and Yuan T. Lee. Yuan-Pern Lee's association with the Academia Sinica began in 1988, when he began working as an adjunct research fellow within the Institute of Atomic and Molecular Sciences. Yuan-Pern Lee has taught at National Chiao Tung University since 2004 as chair of the Department of Applied Chemistry and director of the Institute of Molecular Science. Lee was part of a research team at National Chiao Tung University that discovered the Criegee intermediate CH2OO particle in 2013. Lee was a 2017 recipient of the Humboldt Research Award. In 2019, Lee, Yuan-Tsong Chen, and Wei Fu-chan won Taiwan's .

References

1952 births
Living people
Taiwanese people of Hoklo descent
20th-century Taiwanese scientists
21st-century Taiwanese scientists
Taiwanese chemists
National Taiwan University alumni
University of California, Berkeley alumni
Academic staff of the National Tsing Hua University
Academic staff of the National Chiao Tung University
Members of Academia Sinica
Fellows of the American Physical Society
Humboldt Research Award recipients